Caroline of Baden (13 July 1776 – 13 November 1841) was by marriage an Electress of Bavaria and later the first Queen consort of Bavaria by marriage to Maximilian I Joseph of Bavaria.

Life

Early life
She was the eldest child of Charles Louis, Hereditary Prince of Baden, and his wife Amalie of Hesse-Darmstadt. She was born 13 July 1776, twin sister of Katharina Amalie Christiane Luise. 

Caroline was considered as a bride for Louis Antoine Henri de Bourbon, Duke of Enghien, but the fear of attracting opposition from France made her family hesitate.

Marriage
On 9 March 1797, in Karlsruhe, she became the second spouse of Maximilian, Duke of Palatine Zweibrücken, who two years later would inherit the Electorate of Bavaria. As a result of the dissolution of the Holy Roman Empire in 1806, the rank of Elector became obsolete, and the ruler of Bavaria was promoted to the rank of King. As a result, Caroline became Queen of Bavaria. Caroline had seven children with her husband, including two pairs of twins, an interesting occurrence considering Caroline was also a twin herself.

She was allowed to keep her Protestant religion and had her own Protestant pastor, which was unique for a Bavarian queen. She was described as a very dignified consort and hostess of the Bavarian court and raised her daughters to have a strong sense of duty.

Death and funeral
Caroline of Baden died 13 November 1841, outliving her husband by sixteen years and one month. Due to her Protestant religion, her funeral was conducted with so little royal dignity that there were public protests. By order of the Catholic archbishop of Munich, Lothar Anselm von Gebsattel, all participating Catholic clergy were dressed in ordinary clothes instead of church vestments. The Protestant clergy were halted at the church door and not allowed to proceed inside for the service, so Ludwig Friedrich Schmidt gave the funeral sermon there. Afterward, the funeral procession dissipated, and the coffin was placed in the burial crypt without ceremony. This treatment of his beloved stepmother permanently softened the attitude of Caroline's stepson Ludwig I of Bavaria, who up until that time had been a strong opponent of Protestantism despite his marriage to the Protestant princess Therese of Saxe-Hildburghausen.

Issue

Honours 
  /  : Sovereign of the Order of Saint Elizabeth (feminine order)
  : Dame Grand Cross of the Order of Saint Catherine, 9 April 1801

Ancestors

References

Françoise de Bernardy : "Stéphanie de Beauharnais, fille adoptive de Napoléon et grande-duchesse de Bade " L.A.P. Pais, 1977.

Bavarian queens consort
House of Zähringen
House of Wittelsbach
German twins
Electresses of Bavaria
Duchesses of Berg
Electoral Princesses of Bavaria
1776 births
1841 deaths
Burials at the Theatine Church, Munich
Electresses of the Palatinate